Sagittarius A (Sgr A) is a complex radio source at the center of the Milky Way, which contains a supermassive black hole. It is located in the constellation Sagittarius, and is hidden from view at optical wavelengths by large clouds of cosmic dust in the spiral arms of the Milky Way. The dust lane that obscures the Galactic Center from a vantage point around the Sun causes the Great Rift through the bright bulge of the galaxy.

The radio source consists of three components: the supernova remnant Sagittarius A East, the spiral structure Sagittarius A West, and a very bright compact radio source at the center of the spiral, Sagittarius A* (read "A-star"). These three overlap: Sagittarius A East is the largest, West appears off-center within East, and A* is at the center of West.

Sagittarius spiral arm
A study was done with the measured parallaxes and motions of 10 massive regions in the Sagittarius spiral arm of the Milky Way where stars are formed. Data was gathered using the BeSSeL Survey with the VLBA, and the results were synthesized to discover the physical properties of these sections (called the Galactocentric azimuth, around −2 and 65 degrees). The results were that the spiral pitch angle of the arms is 7.3 ± 1.5 degrees, and the half-width of the arms of the Milky Way were found to be 0.2 kpc. The nearest arm from the Sun is around 1.4 ± 0.2 kpc away.

Sagittarius A East
This feature is approximately 25 light-years in width and has the attributes of a supernova remnant from an explosive event that occurred between 35,000 and 100,000 BC. However, it would take 50 to 100 times more energy than a standard supernova explosion to create a structure of this size and energy. It is conjectured that Sgr A East is the remnant of the explosion of a star that was gravitationally compressed as it made a close approach to the central black hole.

Sagittarius A West

Sgr A West has the appearance of a three-arm spiral, from the point of view of the Earth.  For this reason, it is also known as the "Minispiral". This appearance and nickname are misleading, though: the three-dimensional structure of the Minispiral is not that of a spiral. It is made of several dust and gas clouds, which orbit and fall onto Sagittarius A* at velocities as high as 1,000 kilometers per second. The surface layer of these clouds is ionized. The source of ionisation is the population of massive stars (more than one hundred OB stars have been identified so far) that also occupy the central parsec.

Sgr A West is surrounded by a massive, clumpy torus of cooler molecular gas, the Circumnuclear Disk (CND). The nature and kinematics of the Northern Arm cloud of Sgr A West suggest that it once was a clump in the CND, which fell due to some perturbation, perhaps the supernova explosion responsible for Sgr A East. The Northern Arm appears as a very bright North—South ridge of emission, but it extends far to the East and can be detected as a dim extended source.

The Western Arc (outside the field of view of the image shown in the right) is interpreted as the ionized inner surface of the CND. The Eastern Arm and the Bar seem to be two additional large clouds similar to the Northern Arm, although they do not share the same orbital plane. They have been estimated to amount for about 20 solar masses each.

On top of these large scale structures (of the order of a few light-years in size), many smaller cloudlets and holes inside the large clouds can be seen. The most prominent of these perturbations is the Minicavity, which is interpreted as a bubble blown inside the Northern Arm by the stellar wind of a massive star, which is not clearly identified.

Sagittarius A*

Astronomers now have evidence that there is a supermassive black hole at the center of the galaxy. Sagittarius A* (abbreviated Sgr A*) is agreed to be the most plausible candidate for the location of this supermassive black hole. The Very Large Telescope at Chile and Keck Telescope at Hawaii have detected stars orbiting Sgr A* at speeds greater than that of any other stars in the galaxy. One star, designated S2, was calculated to orbit Sgr A* at speeds of over 5,000 kilometers per second at its closest approach.

A gas cloud, G2, passed through the Sagittarius A* region in 2014 and managed to do so without disappearing beyond the event horizon, as theorists predicted would happen. Rather, it disintegrated, suggesting that G2 and a previous gas cloud, G1, were star remnants with larger gravitational fields than gas clouds.

In September 2019, scientists found that Sagittarius A* had been consuming nearby matter at a much faster rate than usual over the previous year. Researchers speculated that this could mean that the black hole is entering a new phase, or that Sagittarius A* had stripped the outer layer of G2 when it passed through.

Sagittarius A in popular culture 
 In the 2014 space-sim videogame Elite: Dangerous players are able to travel to Sagittarius A*, with an achievement tied to it in the Xbox One and PlayStation versions of the game.
 In the television show Community, Pierce Hawthorne mentions that in his opinion, Sagittarius A is the only black hole worth studying.
 In the H.P. Lovecraft Cthulhu Mythos, Sagittarius A is said to be the location of where the Nuclear Chaos, Azathoth, dwells.
 In the final arc of the Sailor Moon manga series, "Sagittarius Zero Star" is the location of the Galaxy Cauldron, a fictional artifact that serves as the birthplace of all life in the Milky Way.

References

Further reading

External links

 Recent Results of the MPE Infrared/Submillimeter Group 
 Galactic Center Research at MPE
 Nature report, with link to the Schödel et al. paper
 Sagittarius A East
 Kinematic and structural analysis of the Minispiral in the Galactic Center from BEAR spectro-imagery (preprint)
 Chandra Photo Album Sagittarius A
 The Galactic Center (outdated) 
 NASA Image of the Day Gallery, January 6, 2010 Into the Heart of Darkness - Chandra X-ray Observatory image.
 Sagittarius A at Constellation Guide

Astronomical radio sources
Sagittarius A East
Sagittarius (constellation)
Milky Way